The Juncker-Asselborn Ministry may refer to:

 Juncker-Asselborn Ministry I
 Juncker-Asselborn Ministry II